Graceland is the fifth studio album by American singer Kierra Sheard. It was released by Karew Records and Motown Gospel on July 22, 2014. Her debut with her brother's J. Drew Sheard music label, the album debuted at number one on US Top Gospel Albums and reached number 33 on the US Billboard 200, becoming Sheard's highest-charting album yet. Graceland was nominated for a Stellar Award and a GMA Dove Award for Contemporary Gospel/Urban Album of the Year.

Critical reception

AllMusic wrote that "with the album being skillfully laid out and paced, Sheard remains at the forefront of progressive gospel with Graceland."

Track listing

Charts

Weekly charts

Year-end charts

References

Kierra Sheard albums
2014 albums
Urban contemporary gospel albums